Brian Luis Mieres (born 28 July 1995) is an Argentine professional footballer who plays as a right-back for Alvarado.

Career
Mieres played for various youth clubs, having spells with Pumitas, Pamperito, AFIL and Panificaciones before joining San Lorenzo in 2008. In 2016, he was moved into the club's senior squad for an Argentine Primera División match with Arsenal de Sarandí on 12 March but was an unused sub. He made his debut on 19 April during a home draw against L.D.U. Quito in the Copa Libertadores, playing seventy-five minutes before being substituted for Facundo Quignon. On 6 August 2017, Primera B Nacional's Almagro loaned Mieres. In his fourteenth appearance he scored his first career goal versus Los Andes on 11 February 2018.

In July 2018, Mitre became Mieres' third career club. After two goals in twenty total games, Mieres departed in July 2019 to Chacarita Juniors. His contract with them expired on 30 June 2020.

On 27 July 2020, Mieres joined Alvarado.

Career statistics
.

References

External links

1995 births
Living people
People from Paso de los Libres
Argentine footballers
Association football defenders
Argentine Primera División players
Primera Nacional players
San Lorenzo de Almagro footballers
Club Almagro players
Club Atlético Mitre footballers
Chacarita Juniors footballers
Club Atlético Alvarado players
Sportspeople from Corrientes Province